Alexander Jennings Albrecht (born August 14, 1976) is an American television personality, actor and podcaster. He is known for co-hosting the former G4techTV television program The Screen Savers, an hour-long computer and technology variety show, as well as the weekly podcast Diggnation and the weekday podcast The Totally Rad Show on the Revision3 network. On July 15, 2008, he released his new podcast/website Project Lore, all about World of Warcraft. Albrecht has expressed a penchant for dressing up as characters from Street Fighter, most recently appearing as Guile. He is the Head of Original Programming at Caffeine.

Early life
Albrecht is the son of Dr. Mark Albrecht, former President of ILS, and Kathe Hicks Albrecht, past president and director of the Visual Resources Association, curator at American University in Washington, DC. Alex went to elementary school at Burgundy Farm Country Day School, and graduated from American University with a degree in computer science. He was a member of the Delta Chi fraternity. While at college Albrecht was a male cheerleader, with ambitions of becoming a professional mascot.

Career
Albrecht worked for the RAND Corporation as a programmer and IT person and later worked for the Science Applications International Corporation developing multimedia programming for BP.

In 2001, he founded the improv-comedy troupe The Misfit Toys, which performed live in L.A. until 2003.

Albrecht appeared as a contestant on the gameshow Russian Roulette in 2002. He also appeared on Beat the Geeks.

Albrecht was hired by G4techTV to be the co-host alongside Kevin Rose (replacing Patrick Norton) of the television technology show, The Screen Savers, for the first G4techTV episode airing from Los Angeles. The first Los Angeles-based episode of The Screen Savers aired on September 7, 2004.

On November 11, 2004, Albrecht announced on his personal blogs that G4 had decided to revamp The Screen Savers by making it more pop culture, Internet, and gaming-oriented. Alex Albrecht, Yoshi DeHerrera, Dan Huard, executive producer Paul Block, and the show's entire staff (consisting mostly of former TechTV employees) either resigned, made separation deals with G4, or were officially terminated.

On August 5, 2005, Albrecht joined Revision3. Albrecht co-hosted Diggnation, a video podcast that summarizes a selection of the top stories submitted by Digg users, with former The Screen Savers co-host Kevin Rose. Albrecht also contributes to other projects for the company. He co-hosts a podcast called The Totally Rad Show, with Dan Trachtenberg and Jeff Cannata. The first episode was released on March 27, 2007. Albrecht also hosted Ctrl+Alt+Chicken, a weekly cooking show that lasted 8 episodes before being canceled in the fall of 2006.

Albrecht was featured in "SWGack", a weekly podcast on the popular MMORPG, Star Wars Galaxies. On March 4, 2006, he and Joshua Brentano announced on their last episode that they would discontinue the podcast due to disenchantment with the game itself.

Albrecht and Rose also appeared in a Super Bowl ad for GoDaddy.com during Super Bowl XLI. Albrecht has appeared in a Domino's Pizza commercial eating Domino's pizza in a house being raided by the "flavor" police. Alex has also appeared in a Dell commercial, advertising the line of High-Definition Dell LCD televisions; Alex has stated that this commercial was ad libbed. He has also mentioned doing an audition for an advertisement for McDonald's that was never aired in the US, but he has said that it was for British television.

On December 4, 2007, Alex guest hosted Attack of the Show (the show which succeeded his old show on G4, The Screen Savers).

Alex's next project was Project Lore, which launched Tuesday, June 17, 2008. Project Lore is all about the popular video game World of Warcraft. On the show, Alex and friends have shown off all of the five main dungeons available in the game's first expansion pack, The Burning Crusade, starting with the lower levels, and working up. Before World of Warcraft'''s second expansion pack, Wrath of the Lich King was released, the Project Lore team were allowed to showcase some of its new beta content. Project Lore has since been abandoned; there have not been any blog posts for some time and a potential revamp proved too costly and the Project has been turned over into the hands of the volunteer bloggers in hopes that they will continue on their own.

Alex revealed on Totally Rad Show that he was in the pipeline to host NBC's version of Top Gear but the role was ultimately given to somebody else.

In 2009, Alex started an iPhone app company called App Dragon which released one app later that year called Duel.

In March 2010, Alex flew with the U.S. Navy Flight Demonstration Squadron (Blue Angels) in the back seat of Blue Angel #7 (frequently used for media and public relations flights).

In July, 2010, Alex seeks funding for the short film "Neverland" through Indiegogo, in which Alex was named as a director. According to Alex's Twitter account, shooting started July 30, 2010.

He is part of the long form improvisational comedy group Hammer Don't Hurt 'Em, which uses the clap-in format created by director, Stan Wells.

Albrecht has also guest-starred in season 3, episode 4 of an Internet-based live-action parody of The Legend of Zelda called The Legend of Neil. Albrecht's character "Todd" was a member of a small group of soldiers from the elven army, which was led by Zelda's brother Tyrelda. In the series, Zelda is, much to Link/Neil's surprise, black skinned, rather than white. Her brother Tyrelda and the rest of the elf troops are black as well and make constant reference to Alex Albrecht's character being the token white guy. A number of stereotypes associated with African-Americans in the real world are reverse-applied to Todd and the white elf race in the land of Highrule. By the end of the episode, Todd appears to have died along with Tyrelda and the rest of the gang, making for a short-lived but noteworthy contribution made by Alex to the series.

In May 2012, a new show was released on the Nerdist YouTube Channel called 4 Points with Alex Albrecht. The show features 4 people discussing 4 different topics. Albrecht and co-host Alison Haislip are the only permanent members of the panel, with the other spots filled by a personality from some other Nerdist show and a celebrity, usually from TV or movies.

In April 2015, Alex and Alison Haislip started a new podcast called the Half Hour Happy Hour. He left the show in December 2018 and was replaced by Maude Garrett.

He resides in Brentwood, a suburb of Los Angeles, California.

 Filmography 
 The Legend of Neil as Todd
 The Romantic'' as The Spank

References

External links
 
 

1976 births
American University alumni
Living people
American podcasters
Revision3
People from Vienna, Virginia
People from Brentwood, Los Angeles